Brighton College is an independent, co-educational boarding and day school for boys and girls aged 3 to 18 in Brighton, England. It is a public school in the British meaning of the term. The school has three sites: Brighton College (the senior school, ages 11 to 18); Brighton College Preparatory School (children aged 8 to 13, located next to the senior school); and the Pre-Prep School (children aged 3 to 8).

Brighton College was named England's Independent School 2019 of the Year by The Sunday Times. In 2018 it was ranked fifth in the country for average A-level results, with 99% of grades being A*–B.

In 2011, Brighton College opened its first international campus in Abu Dhabi. Brighton College International Schools (BCIS) has subsequently opened campuses in Al Ain, Bangkok, Dubai and Singapore.

In September 2023 the Brighton College Prep Kensington school opens in central London.

History 

Founded in 1845 by William Aldwin Soames, Brighton College was the first Victorian public school to be founded in Sussex. Soames originally planned for use of the Brighton Pavilion, but after refusal by Queen Victoria, built the school in the suburb of Kemptown, Brighton.

The school occupied a niche in the development of English secondary education during the 19th century. Activities include:
The use of individual classrooms for teaching small groups
Being an early pioneer in teaching both modern languages and science
Inventing the school magazine (1852)
Building the first school gymnasium (1859)
Erecting the first purpose-built science laboratory (1871)

Brighton College led the legal fight to secure the charitable tax status currently enjoyed by all registered charities. A long-running legal action between the school and the Inland Revenue from 1916 to 1926 produced a series of changes to tax law in the 1918 Income Tax Act, the 1921 and 1922 Finance Acts and, above all, section 24 of the 1927 Finance Act. The case (Brighton College v Marriott) went to the High Court in 1924, the Court of Appeal later that year, and ultimately the House of Lords in 1925.

It was the first independent school to introduce compulsory Mandarin Chinese from the age of 13, and in 2006 was the first public school in England to sign a deal with the Chinese government to encourage the teaching of Mandarin and Chinese culture.

Large numbers of Brighton College boys fought in both World Wars, with 149 Old Brightonians fallen in World War I and 173 during World War II.

Houses 
The pastoral system at Brighton College is house based. There are 15 houses which are split by gender (with the exception of Alexander House). Staff of both sexes can be attached to any house. Houses contain between 48 and 85 pupils and are supervised by a house master or house mistress (HMM) and a team of personal tutors. Boarding houses also have a matron and house keeping staff. The HMM appoints Upper Sixth Formers (Year 13) as house prefects to look after and mentor younger members, and one as head pupil to represent their house at house events and competitions.

In September 2017, Brighton College's 14th house was opened, Alexander House. This was the first mixed-gender house in the college and is only for the Upper Sixth formers, who decide during their Lower Sixth year if they wish to move into this house, with all members coming from other boarding houses. In their final year, roughly half of boarders choose to enter the house.

For years 7–8 there is a single house, Lower School, for those aged 11, 12, and 13 years old who took the 11+ test. This house does not have boarding and is for both boys and girls..

List of houses

Awards 

 England's Independent School of the Year 2012 – The Sunday Times
 England's Independent School of the Year 2019 – The Sunday Times
 England's Independent Secondary School of the Decade 2010–2020 – The Sunday Times 
 England's Public School Headmaster of the Year 2012 by Tatler magazine.

Site and buildings 

Brighton College is located in Brighton's Kemptown area, in the east of the city. The school occupies three sites, facing south onto Eastern Road. It is immediately to the east of the site of the former Kemptown railway station, across Sutherland Road. Its principal buildings are in the gothic revival style by Sir George Gilbert Scott RA (flint with Caen stone dressings, 1848–66). Later buildings were designed by his pupil and former student at the college Sir Thomas Graham Jackson RA (brick and flint with cream and pink terracotta dressings, 1883–87; flint with Clipsham stone dressings 1922–23).

George Bell, Bishop of Chichester created the school grounds as an extra-parochial ecclesiastical district. Placed outside the parish of St. Matthew's, Brighton, the school chapel holds an episcopal licence to perform weddings.

Under the stewardship of Head Master Richard Cairns, the school has added a series of buildings to the college campus:

 2008: the Alexander Arts Centre
 2011: The Skidelsky Building (winner of a RIBA award)
 2011: the new Pre-Prep school
 2012: the Diamond Jubilee Pavilion (winner of a RIBA award), a new cricket pavilion at the school's fields near East Brighton Park. It was opened by the Earl and Countess of Wessex in July 2012.
 2012: the Simon Smith Building (winner of a RIBA award)
 2013: New House (winner of a RIBA award)
 2014: Cairns Tower (winner of a RIBA award) 
 2015: The Music School and Sarah Abraham Recital Hall (winner of a RIBA award)
 2017: Alexander House
 2017: The Kai Yong Yeoh Building (RIBA nominee; Sussex Heritage Trust Award nominee)
 2020: the School of Sports and Science - this £55 million building, which includes 18 university-standard laboratories, a rooftop running track, swimming pool and double-height sports hall, was designed by the Rotterdam-based Office for Metropolitan Architecture (OMA).

Lower School 
In September 2009, the school opened a new "Lower School" for children between the ages of 11 and 13. The site of this new part of the Senior School is on the old Art Block, with that now having moved to above the Woolton Quad. The Lower School means that Brighton College has been open to intake children at the age of 11 into the senior school for the first time in its history, as opposed to its traditional youngest intake of thirteen-year-old boys and girls, since the academic year starting 2009.

Policies 

In January 2016, Headmaster Richard Cairns announced that Brighton College would abandon gender-specific uniforms and instead introduce a "trouser uniform" and a "skirt uniform," with both boys and girls under age 16 being free to choose which to wear. According to Cairns, Brighton College is “reacting to a changing society which recognises that some children have gender dysphoria and do not wish to lose their emotional gender identities at school.” Parental consent must be provided in order for a pupil to choose their uniform, and a pupil must wear either the "trouser uniform" or the "skirt uniform" in totality rather than a combination of the two. In addition, such a choice must be made on a permanent basis.

In 2017 the school invited Stonewall Ambassador Ian McKellen to share its anti-bullying message. The school has regularly made headlines for its pro-LGBT stance, emphasising the right of all pupils to feel safe and supported. For the 2013–14 academic year the school appointed the first openly gay head boy of an English independent school. In August 2017 the school participated in the Brighton Pride Parade, becoming the first public school in the United Kingdom to do so. The float was backed by Ian McKellen. This has become an annual event for the school, with pupils and staff designing and making the float.

The school positions community service as a “vital part of school life”. Pupils are involved in 328 days of community service a year – which includes visiting elderly people, teaching pensioners about technology, and working with local community initiatives.

The school is recognised as having an ethos of kindness and respect, in addition to academic excellence. The school's most recent Independent Schools Inspectorate report summarises:

Fees 

For the 2018/19 academic year the fees were £23,160 for day pupils. Boarding ranged from £33,390 - £37,470 pa. The school offers a number of scholarships and bursaries, offered on the basis of merit and need.

Activities 
In the 2019 A-level examinations Brighton College achieved 99% A*B (82%A*/A). In the 2019 GCSE examinations they scored 94% 9–7. Class sizes at GCSE average 18, and at A-level they average 8. 26 subjects are offered at A-level.

The school has an extensive co-curriculum provision, with the option of “over 100 clubs and activities” in which pupils may participate. This includes drama (with 15 productions a year), dance (7 styles of dance and 70 classes per week), music (22 music groups) and art (100% A* results).

The school has an ethos of "sports for all" and offers a range sport choices. The major sports are athletics, cricket, netball and rugby. All pupils participate in games of their choice twice a week. The college was selected to provide training ground for Japan during the course of Rugby World Cup 2015. Going forward, England Head Coach Eddie Jones, Japan coach then, has hosted the elite player squad training camps at the college.

Principals and head masters 

Rev. Arthur Macleane (1846)
Rev. Henry Cotterill (1851), subsequently Bishop of Grahamstown and Edinburgh
Rev. Dr. John Griffith (1856)
Rev. Dr. Charles Bigg (1871), subsequently Regius Professor of Ecclesiastical History, Oxford
Rev. Thomas Hayes Belcher (1881)
Rev. Robert Halley Chambers (1892), formerly Principal of Victoria College, Jersey, subsequently Head Master of Christ College, Brecon
Rev. Arthur Titherington (1895)
Rev. Canon William Dawson (1906), formerly Headmaster of Corby Grammar School and The King's School, Grantham
Rev. Arthur Belcher (1933), a pupil 1886–95, son of Rev. Thomas Hayes Belcher
Christopher Fairfax Scott (1937), formerly Headmaster of Monmouth School 1928-37
Walter Hett (1939)
Arthur Stuart-Clark (1944), formerly Headmaster of Steyning Grammar School
Roland Lester (1950) (acting)
William Stewart MC (1950), subsequently Master of Haileybury and Imperial Service College
Henry Christie (1963), subsequently Warden of St Edward's School, Oxford
William Blackshaw (1971)
John Leach (1987)
Dr. Anthony Seldon (1997), subsequently Master of Wellington College
Simon Smith (2005) (acting)
Richard Cairns (2006)

The title of principal was changed to Head Master in December 1885. The requirement for the Head Master to be an ordained priest of the Church of England was removed in 1909.

Note: Simon Smith returned to his position as Second Master after Richard Cairns took leadership in 2006.

Notable alumni and members of staff

Brighton College Abu Dhabi 
In 2010, Brighton College announced that it was "helping to set up schools in Abu Dhabi". This venture was a for-profit franchise operation through a company the school had set up, Brighton College International Schools Ltd, in a joint venture with a UAE property development company called Bloom Properties. Brendan Law, previously of Westbourne House School in Chichester, West Sussex, was named Headmaster of Brighton College Abu Dhabi in September 2010, and the school opened in September 2011. Law was replaced by Ken Grocott, former Head of Geography at Brighton College, in September 2012.

See also
 Brighton College Preparatory School

References

Bibliography 
G. P. Burstow, "Documents relating to the Early History of Brighton College", The Sussex County Magazine, October 1951 and August 1952.
G. P. Burstow & M. B. Whittaker (ed. Sir Sydney Roberts), "A History of Brighton College." (Brighton, 1957).
Martin D. W. Jones, "A Short History of Brighton College." (Brighton College, 1986).
Martin D. W. Jones, "Brighton College 1845-1995." (Phillimore, Chichester, 1995) .
Martin D. W. Jones, "Brighton College v Marriott: Schools, charity law and taxation.", History of Education, 12 no.2 (1983).
Martin D. W. Jones, "Gothic Enriched: Thomas Jackson's Mural Tablets at Brighton College Chapel.", Church Monuments, VI (1991).
 
H. J. Mathews (ed.), "Brighton College Register, Part 1, 1847-1863." (Farncombe, Brighton, 1886).
E. K. Milliken (ed.), "Brighton College Register 1847-1922." (Brighton, 1922).
Anon., "Brighton College War Record 1914-1919." (Farncombe, Brighton, 1920). Compiled by Walter Hett.

External links 

Official website
Profile at the Good Schools Guide
Alumni website
Brighton College's own list of alumni
College makes Mandarin compulsory
ISI Inspection Reports (Senior School)

Private schools in Brighton and Hove
Educational institutions established in 1845
Member schools of the Headmasters' and Headmistresses' Conference
 
Boarding schools in East Sussex
George Gilbert Scott buildings